The 2021 División Profesional season (officially the Copa de Primera TIGO-Visión Banco 2021 for sponsorship reasons) was the 87th season of the Paraguayan Primera División, the top-flight professional football league in Paraguay. The season began on 5 February and ended on 5 December 2021. The fixtures for the season were announced on 15 January 2021. Olimpia were the defending champions after winning the 2020 Clausura tournament.

In the Torneo Apertura, Libertad secured their twenty-first league title with one match to spare following Nacional's loss to River Plate on 23 May, whilst in the Torneo Clausura Cerro Porteño won their thirty-fourth league title after drawing with eventual runners-up Guaraní 2–2 on the last matchday played on 4 December.

Teams
Ten teams competed in the season: the top ten teams in the relegation table of the previous season, with no teams promoted from the División Intermedia since the 2020 seasons of the lower-tier club tournaments of Paraguayan football were cancelled by the Paraguayan Football Association due to the COVID-19 pandemic. General Díaz and San Lorenzo were both relegated to the second tier at the end of the previous season after eight and two years in the top flight, respectively.

Stadia and locations

Managerial changes

Notes

Torneo Apertura
The Campeonato de Apertura, named "Centenario del Sportivo Luqueño", was the 123rd official championship of the Primera División and the first championship of the 2021 season. It started on 5 February and ended on 30 May.

Standings

Results

Top scorers

Source: Soccerway

Torneo Clausura
The Campeonato de Clausura, named "Homenaje a César Zabala", was the 124th official championship of the Primera División and the second championship of the 2021 season. It began on 16 July and ended on 5 December.

Standings

Results

Top scorers

Source: Soccerway

Aggregate table

Relegation
Relegation is determined at the end of the season by computing an average of the number of points earned per game over the past three seasons. The team with the lowest average was relegated to the División Intermedia for the following season, while the team with the second lowest average played a double-legged relegation play-off against the 2021 Intermedia fourth placed team.

Relegation table
 Source: APF

Promotion/relegation play-off

Sportivo Ameliano won 4–3 on aggregate and were promoted to Primera División. Sportivo Luqueño were relegated to the División Intermedia.

Season awards
On 14 December 2021 a ceremony was held at the Paraguayan Football Association's headquarters to announce the winners of the season awards (Premios de Primera), who were chosen based on voting by the managers of the 10 Primera División teams, local sports journalists, the APF's Referee Commission, the public as well as official statistics.

References

External links
APF's official website 

Paraguay
Paraguayan Primera División seasons
P